In the course of DC Comics' 2005–2006 event Infinite Crisis (the seven-issue limited series, its lead-in stories, and various tie-ins), numerous characters died, went missing, returned from death or long absences, took new superhero identities, or underwent other significant changes as individual characters.

Deaths

Leadup to Infinite Crisis
These characters died during Infinite Crisis lead-up events, beginning with Countdown to Infinite Crisis:
 Black Bison (John Ravenhair) (Day of Vengeance #1)
 Blue Beetle (Ted Kord) (Countdown to Infinite Crisis)
 Bug (Villains United #1)
 Cheetah (Priscilla Rich) (Flash #219)
 Darkstars Ferrin Colos, Chaser Bron, and Munchuk (Adam Strange #8)
 Fastball (The OMAC Project #6)
 Fiddler (Villains United #1)
 Firefly (The OMAC Project #6)
 Hawkwoman (Shayera Thal) (Rann–Thanagar War #5)
 Hyena (Villains United #3; which Hyena died is unknown)
 Hyperion (DC Special: The Return of Donna Troy #4)
 Maxwell Lord (Wonder Woman #219)
 Monocle (Manhunter #9)
 Onimar Synn (Rann-Thanagar War #6)
 Overthrow (The OMAC Project #3)
 Parademon (Villains United #6)
 Pariah (Villains United #6)
 Rocket Red (Dimitri Pushkin) (The OMAC Project #5)
 Shazam (Day of Vengeance #6)
 Sparta of Synriannaq (DC Special: The Return of Donna Troy #1)
 Thia (DC Special: The Return of Donna Troy #4)

Infinite Crisis
In addition to millions of deaths worldwide (e.g., Blüdhaven populace), these characters died during the publication of Infinite Crisis and connected stories:
 Alexander Luthor, Jr. (Infinite Crisis #7)
 Ballistic (Infinite Crisis #7)
 Baron Blitzkrieg (Infinite Crisis #7)
 Black Condor (Ryan Kendall) (Infinite Crisis #1)
 Bushido (Infinite Crisis #4, Teen Titans #33)
 Carissa, Amazon Warrior (Infinite Crisis #2, Wonder Woman  #223)
 Charaxes (Infinite Crisis #7)
 Crispus Allen (Gotham Central #38; see Returns below.)
 Doctor Fate/Hector Hall (JSA #79)
 Doctor Fate/Nabu (Day of Vengeance Infinite Crisis Special #1)
 Doctor Polaris (Infinite Crisis #1)
 Fel Andar (Hawkman #48)
 Fisherman (Gotham Central #37)
 Fury (Lyta Trevor-Hall) (JSA #80)
 Geist (Infinite Crisis #7)
 Thirty-two Green Lantern Corps members (Infinite Crisis #7)
 The Hangmen (death revealed Manhunter #21)
 Human Bomb (Infinite Crisis #1)
 Jack (Deuce Canyard) (Villains United Infinite Crisis Special #1)
 Jade (Rann-Thanagar War Infinite Crisis Special #1)
 Kal-L, Superman of Earth-Two  (Infinite Crisis #7)
 Koryak, Aquaman's son (Aquaman #38)
 Lois Lane Kent of Earth-Two (Infinite Crisis #5)
 Mick Wong, Jason Rusch's best friend and then-partner-as-Firestorm (Infinite Crisis #4)
 Mongrel (Infinite Crisis #7)
 Neptune Perkins (Infinite Crisis #3)
 Nightblade (Infinite Crisis #7)
 Pantha (Infinite Crisis #4, Teen Titans #33)
 Peacemaker (Mitchell Black) (Infinite Crisis #7)
 Phantom Lady (Dee Tyler) (Infinite Crisis #1)
 Psycho-Pirate (Roger Hayden) (Infinite Crisis #6)
 Rag Doll (Peter Merkel, Sr.) (JSA Classified #7)
 Ratcatcher (Infinite Crisis #1)
 Razorsharp (Infinite Crisis #7)
 Sam Kurtis, Stargirl's con-artist father (JSA #81)
 Star Sapphire (Deborah Darnell) (Infinite Crisis #6)
 Superboy (Conner Kent) (Infinite Crisis #6)
 Steve Trevor of Earth-Two (death revealed in Infinite Crisis #5)
 Tekla, Amazon Warrior (Wonder Woman #223)
 Vulko of Atlantis (Aquaman #38)
 Warden Daniel of Enclave M (Villains United Infinite Crisis Special #1)
 Wildebeest (Infinite Crisis #4, Teen Titans #33)

Unconfirmed deaths
These characters appeared to die during Infinite Crisis and lead-up storylines, but their deaths or possible survival remained either unconfirmed or debatable by the series' end. (Refer to these characters' individual articles to see if they returned or were confirmed dead after Infinite Crisis #7.)

 Amos Fortune (Villains United Infinite Crisis Special #1)
 Breach (Infinite Crisis #7)
 Byte (Villains United #1)
 Chain Lightning (Outsiders #33)
 Cinnamon II (civilian name unknown) (Villains United Infinite Crisis Special #1)
 Demolition Team (The OMAC Project #6)
 Eradicator (David Connor) (Superman vol. 2 #220)
 Judomaster (Rip Jagger) (Infinite Crisis #7)
 Kite Man (Infinite Crisis #2, rumored)
 Lady Spellbinder (Infinite Crisis #7)
 Looker (Infinite Crisis #7)
 The Madmen (Infinite Crisis #7)
 Mister Mxyzptlk (Adventures of Superman #647)
 Royal Flush Gang (Joe Carny and associates) (Infinite Crisis #2)
 Stallion (Infinite Crisis #4)
 Supermen of America (The OMAC Project #6)
 Technocrat (Infinite Crisis #7)
 Trigger Twins (Tom and Tad Trigger) (Infinite Crisis #7)
 T'Charr and Terataya (Day of Vengeance Infinite Crisis Special #1)
 Wonder Woman of Earth-Two (Infinite Crisis #5; appears to fade from existence)

In the case of the Demolition Team and the Supermen of America, it is unclear how many (if any) of their members were slain by OMACs.

Missing

These characters disappeared or went missing during Infinite Crisis and lead-up storylines. Note to readers: Many of these characters may return or already have, as revealed in "One Year Later" stories or hinted at in Infinite Crisis #7's two-page splash showing heroes to be featured in upcoming projects, but remain listed here because this article is about their in-story status as of the end of Infinite Crisis.  (Refer to their individual articles to see if they later returned.)

Characters noted below as having gone missing during Infinite Crisis #4 or Infinite Crisis #6 were confirmed missing in Infinite Crisis #7.

 Adam Strange (Infinite Crisis #6)
 Air Wave (Harold Jordan) (Infinite Crisis #4)
 Animal Man (Infinite Crisis #6)
 Blue Beetle (Jaime Reyes) (Infinite Crisis #6)
 Bumblebee (Infinite Crisis #6)
 Captain Comet (Infinite Crisis #6)
 Cerdian, son of Garth and Dolphin (Infinite Crisis #3, confirmed in Aquaman #38)
 Cyborg (Victor Stone) (Infinite Crisis #6)
 Dolphin (Infinite Crisis #3, confirmed in Aquaman #38)
 Firestorm (Jason Rusch and Martin Stein) (Infinite Crisis #6)  
 Flash (Wally West) (Infinite Crisis #4)  
 Green Lantern (Alan Scott) (Infinite Crisis #6)  
 Hawkgirl (Kendra Saunders) (Infinite Crisis #6)
 Herald (Infinite Crisis #6)
 Lagoon Boy (Infinite Crisis #3, confirmed in Aquaman #38)
 L.E.G.I.O.N. (Infinite Crisis #6)
 Linda Park-West (Infinite Crisis #4)
 Lori Lemaris (Infinite Crisis #3, confirmed in Aquaman #38)
 Omega Men (Infinite Crisis #6)
 Red Tornado (Ulthoon) (Infinite Crisis #6)
 Shift (Infinite Crisis #6)
 Starfire (Koriand'r) (Infinite Crisis #6)
 Supergirl (Kara Zor-El) (Infinite Crisis #6)
 Tempest (Garth) (Infinite Crisis #3, confirmed in Aquaman #38)
 Uncle Sam of the Freedom Fighters (Infinite Crisis #1, confirmed in Infinite Crisis #2)
 West twins, children of Wally West and Linda Park-West (Infinite Crisis #4)

Returns
These characters returned from death or a prolonged absence sometime following the publication of Countdown to Infinite Crisis:
 Amethyst, Princess of Gemworld (Infinite Crisis #7; was seen battling the Spectre on Gemworld, later aided in the reconstruction of the Rock of Eternity and the summoning of the Specter in Infinite Crisis #6)
 Alexander Luthor, Jr. (Infinite Crisis #1, but posed as the Society's Luthor as early as Countdown to Infinite Crisis; see Deaths above)
 Captain Atom (Infinite Crisis #7)
 Crispus Allen (Infinite Crisis #4, as new host for the Spectre; technically still dead)
 Kal-L, Superman of Earth-Two (Infinite Crisis #1; see Deaths above)
 Kid Eternity (Teen Titans #31)
 Lady Quark (Villains United #5)
 Legion of Super-Heroes - "Reboot" team (Infinite Crisis #6, revealed to be inhabitants of Earth-247)
 Lois Lane of Earth-Two (Infinite Crisis #1; see Deaths above)
 Rocket Red Brigade (Villains United Infinite Crisis Special #1)
 Superboy-Prime (Infinite Crisis #1, but has been active for some time; was glimpsed in JLA #119; see New or changed below)
 Jason Todd (Batman #617, Batman #638)
 Donna Troy (DC Special: The Return of Donna Troy #1)
 Wonder Woman of Earth-Two (Infinite Crisis #5; see Deaths above)

Also, several characters from alternate continuities appeared in single-panel cameos when their respective alternate Earths emerged in Infinite Crisis #6. Although some had appeared in recent years (e.g., heroes of Fawcett City, Tangent Comics, DC Comics Western comics, and the Earth-247 Legion of Super-Heroes) and some characters that had appeared in other media but had never previously appeared in comic book form (e.g., heroes from the 1970s Wonder Woman television programs), several others made their first appearance since before Crisis on Infinite Earths. They included:
 Batman, Jr.
 Bizarro Hawkman
 Bizarro Jimmy Olsen 
 Bizarro Krypto 
 Bizarro Lois Lane
 Bizarro Perry White
 Superman, Jr.

New or changed characters
The following characters were changed or introduced during Infinite Crisis and connected stories. See the article on 52 for characters who were introduced following the "One Year Later" jump.
 Amazons of Themyscira departed from regular plane of existence (Infinite Crisis #3)
 Artemis of Bana-Mighdall departed from regular plane of existence (Infinite Crisis #3)
 Bart Allen aged to adulthood, then seemingly depowered (Infinite Crisis #5, Infinite Crisis #7)
 Captain Marvel (Billy Batson) as the new protector of the Rock of Eternity (Day of Vengeance Infinite Crisis Special #1)
 Crispus Allen as the new host for the Spectre (Infinite Crisis #4)
 Helmet of Doctor Fate sent away to find new master (Day of Vengeance Infinite Crisis Special #1)
 Damage critically injured by Zoom (Infinite Crisis #1, confirmed in Infinite Crisis #2)
 Firestorm redesigned by Jason Rusch and Professor Martin Stein (Firestorm #22)
 Fury (Helena Kosmatos) departed from regular plane of existence (Infinite Crisis #3)
 Greek deities departed from regular plane of existence (Infinite Crisis #3, Teen Titans #33)
 Flash (Jay Garrick) with top speed reduced (Infinite Crisis #7)
 Jaime Reyes as the new Blue Beetle (introduced Infinite Crisis #3, debuted in costume in Infinite Crisis #5)
 Jason Todd as the new Red Hood (Batman #617, Batman #638)
 Kyle Rayner as Ion (Rann-Thanagar War Infinite Crisis Special #1)
 Power Girl's conflicting origins resolved, reconfirmed as Earth-Two's Kara Zor-L (JSA Classified #4)
 Risk's arm severed (Infinite Crisis #4)
 Superboy-Prime depowered, imprisoned by Green Lantern Corps (Infinite Crisis #7)
 Superman (Kal-El) depowered (Infinite Crisis #7)
 Wonder Girl (Cassandra Sandsmark) with new powers as a champion for Ares (Teen Titans #33)

These heroes stated at the end of Infinite Crisis #7 that they would take time off from their superhero identities:
 Batman (Bruce Wayne)
 Nightwing (Dick Grayson)
 Robin (Tim Drake)
 Superman (Kal-El)
 Wonder Woman (Diana)

Aftermath
 52: Weekly comic book post-Infinite Crisis depicting events of missing year between end of event and One Year Later titles.
 "One Year Later": Time-jump across most DC titles occurring around the same date of publication of the final issues of Infinite Crisis.

See also
 Continuity changes during Infinite Crisis

References

External links
 Newsarama's "Crisis Casualty Count": Part 1  and Part 2 

Infinite Crisis